The 1995–96 Czech 1.liga season was the third season of the Czech 1.liga, the second level of ice hockey in the Czech Republic. 14 teams participated in the league, and HC Slezan Opava and HC Prerov were promoted to the Czech Extraliga.

Regular season

Playoffs

1/8 Final 
 IHC Písek – BK Havlíčkův Brod 2:1 (3:6, 4:0, 5:2)
 H + S Beroun HC – HC Baník Sokolov 2:1 (2:4, 5:1, 6:3)
 TJ Slovan Jindřichův Hradec – HC Prostějov 1:2 (3:6, 2:1 n.V., 2:3 n.V.)
 HC Slovan Ústí nad Labem – HC Kralupy nad Vltavou 1:2 (1:2, 5:3, 3:7)

Quarterfinals
 HC Slezan Opava – HC Prostějov 2:0 (3:0, 2:0)
 HC Přerov – HC Kralupy nad Vltavou 2:0 (4:3 P, 11:1)
  HC Becherovka Karlovy Vary – H + S Beroun HC 2:0 (3:1, 5:1)
 HC Femax Havířov – IHC Písek 1:2 (1:2 SN, 7:3, 3:9)

Semifinals 
 HC Slezan Opava – IHC Písek 2:0 (4:3, 4:1)
 HC Přerov – HC Becherovka Karlovy Vary 2:1 (1:4, 6:3, 4:0)

Relegation

External links
 Season on hockeyarchives.info

2
Czech
Czech 1. Liga seasons